Driebruggen is a village in the Dutch province of South Holland. It is a part of the former municipality of Reeuwijk, and lies about 6 km east of Gouda.

According to the 1615 map of Rijnland, there were indeed three bridge in Driebruggen. Driebruggen is a road village without a church which developed in the 17th century near the bridge over the Dubbele Wiericke.

Driebruggen was a separate municipality between 1964 and 1989. The name from this village means 3 bridges. It was created in a merger of Hekendorp, Lange Ruige Weide, Papekop, and Waarder.

Gallery

References

Bodegraven-Reeuwijk
Populated places in South Holland
Former municipalities of South Holland